The Association for Vertical Farming e. V. (AVF) is the leading global, non-profit organization that enables international exchange and cooperation in order to accelerate the development of the Indoor/Vertical Farming industry.

The AVF was founded in Munich, Germany on July 18, 2013 and started out by gathering data to map out the urban farms all over the world and by developing a glossary to bring consistency to the industry while making the complex growing methods easier to understand for newcomers to the vertical farming space.

The AVF hosts summits, workshops, and info days and collaborates with other organizations around the world.

Vision 
The AVF acknowledges that vertical farming in its current state can provide access to fresh, safe, and sufficient food, independent of climate and location. In the decades to come, where overpopulation and severe planetary changes challenge our current way of life, vertical farming will become a necessary solution in global food production.

History

References

Non-profit organisations based in Bavaria
Urban agriculture
Agriculture